Christopher Smith (born September 4, 1966) is a former American racing driver from Palos Verdes Estates, California.  He competed in the Toyota Atlantic series beginning in 1991 and captured 3 wins on his way to the 1992 championship, he was unable to move up the ladder the following year though and only competed in a single Atlantics race that year.  He found a ride in Indy Lights in 1994, in eight starts, Smith only managed a best finish of 8th place and finished a disappointing 19th in series points.  After his Indy Lights experience, Smith participated in a single Indy Lights race in 1995 and partial Atlantics seasons in 1995, 1996, and 1997 with few notable results.

References

1966 births
Atlantic Championship drivers
SCCA Formula Super Vee drivers
Indy Lights drivers
Living people
Sportspeople from Los Angeles County, California
Racing drivers from California
People from Palos Verdes Estates, California